Hunt City is an unincorporated community in Hunt City Township, Jasper County, Illinois, United States.

Geography

Notable residents
Singer and actor Burl Ives was born in Hunt City and is buried in Hunt City's Mound Cemetery.

References

External links

Unincorporated communities in Illinois
Unincorporated communities in Jasper County, Illinois